Belli Modagalu (transl. Silver clouds) is a 1992 Indian Kannada language drama film, starring Ramesh Aravind, Malashri, Doddanna and Jayanthi in the lead roles. The film is directed by K. V. Raju. It is a remake of the Telugu film Seetharamaiah Gari Manavaralu which was earlier remade in Malayalam as Sandhwanam by Sibi Malayil and later remade in Hindi in 1994 as Udhaar Ki Zindagi by K V Raju himself.

Cast 
 Ramesh Aravind
 Malashri as Seetha
 Jayanthi 
 Doddanna
 Thoogudeepa Srinivas
 Ramakrishna
 Avinash
 Jyothi
 Ramamurthy

Soundtrack 
All the songs were composed and scored by Upendra Kumar.

References 

1992 films
1990s Kannada-language films
Kannada remakes of Telugu films
Indian drama films